Parents of the Strict Regime is a 2022 Russian tragicomedy film directed and produced by Nikita Vladimirov. The film tells about an elderly couple who suddenly find out that their 38-year-old mayor son is in fact a corrupt official and a bribe-taker, and they decide to invite him to their house, where they lock him up in the hope that he can be re-educated. The film stars Yevgeny Tkachuk, Alisa Freindlich and Aleksandr Adabashyan.

It was theatrically released in Russia on April 14, 2022, by MVK (English: Cartoon in the cinema).

Plot 
A married couple turns to a psychologist because of problems with a child - their son Boris Litvin is rude, lies and steals. After talking with a specialist, they take decisive action and put their son under house arrest. True, their "boy" is already thirty-seven years old and he is the mayor of the city. While Boris is looking for his wife, the administration and the police, he is being "re-educated" by his parents - he goes for a walk in the yard by the hour, and also works in his father's workshop, because work, as you know, ennobles a person.

Cast 
  as Boris Litvin, a corrupt mayor, and a son
 Alisa Freindlich as Vera Litvina, a mother
 Aleksandr Adabashyan as Valentin Litvin, a father
 Olga Medynich as Svetlana, Boris's wife
 Igor Khripunov as Misha
  as a Russian policeman
 Valeria Fedorovich as a female psychologist
 Elena Rufanova as chief physician

Production 

As the portal of culture of Saint Petersburg clarifies, the full-length picture of director Nikita Vladimirov will be presented by Alisa Freindlich, who has rarely pleased fans of her work with her appearance on the big screen in recent years, as well as Aleksandr Adabashyan, Yevgeny Tkachuk and members of the crew.

in 2015, the distributor of this comedy picture in the Russian territory is the company "Mult" TV channel (English: "Cartoon" TV channel), together with the All-Russia State Television and Radio Broadcasting Company (VGTRK), launched a unique project on the film market, "MULT V KINO" (English: "CARTOON IN THE CINEMA"), which has now changed its name to MVK distributors.

Release 
It was theatrically released the Russian Federation should take place in cinemas from April 14, 2022, by MVK.

Marketing 
The first teaser trailer for Parents of the Strict Regime was released on April 1, 2022.

See also
 House Arrest (1996 film)

References

External links 
 

2022 films
2020s Russian-language films
2022 black comedy films
2020s crime comedy films
Russian black comedy films
Russian crime comedy films
Tragicomedy films
Films shot in Saint Petersburg